USS Indianapolis (CL/CA-35) was a  heavy cruiser of the United States Navy, named for the city of Indianapolis, Indiana. Launched in 1931, it was the flagship for the commander of Scouting Force 1 for eight years, then flagship for Admiral Raymond Spruance in 1943 and 1944 while he commanded the Fifth Fleet in battles across the Central Pacific during World War II.

In July 1945, Indianapolis completed a top-secret high-speed trip to deliver uranium and other components for "Little Boy", the first nuclear weapon ever used in combat, to the Tinian Naval Base, and subsequently departed for the Philippines on training duty. At 0015 on 30 July, the ship was torpedoed by the Imperial Japanese Navy submarine , and sank in 12 minutes. Of 1,195 crewmen aboard, approximately 300 went down with the ship. The remaining 890 faced exposure, dehydration, saltwater poisoning, and shark attacks while stranded in the open ocean with few lifeboats and almost no food or water. The Navy only learned of the sinking four days later, when survivors were spotted by the crew of a PV-1 Ventura on routine patrol. A US Navy PBY seaplane crew landed to save those in the water. Only 316 survived. 

The sinking of Indianapolis resulted in the greatest loss of life at sea from a single ship in the history of the US Navy. On 20 December, 2018, the crew of Indianapolis was collectively awarded a Congressional Gold Medal.

Construction

Ordered for the US Navy in fiscal year 1930, Indianapolis was originally designated as a light cruiser because of her thin armor and given the hull classification symbol CL-35. She was reclassified a heavy cruiser, because of her  guns, with the symbol CA-35 on 1 July 1931, in accordance with the London Naval Treaty.

However, when completed, Indianapolis did not reach this weight, displacing . The ship had two distinctive raked funnels, a tripod foremast, and a small tower and pole mast aft. In 1943, light tripods were added forward of the second funnel on each ship, and a prominent Naval director was installed aft.

The ship had four propeller shafts and four Parsons GT geared turbines and eight White-Forster boilers. She rolled badly until fitted with a bilge keel.

The cruiser had nine 8-inch/55 caliber Mark 9 guns in three triple mounts, a superfiring pair fore and one aft. For anti-aircraft defense, she had eight 5-inch/25 caliber guns and two QF 3 pounder Hotchkiss guns. In 1945, she received twenty-four  Bofors guns, arrayed in six quad mounts. Both ships were upgraded with nineteen  Oerlikon cannons. The ship did not have torpedo tubes.

Portland-class cruisers were outfitted as fleet flagships, with space for a flag officer and his staff. The class also had two aircraft catapults amidships. They could carry four aircraft. The total crew varied, with a regular designed complement of 807 and a wartime complement of 952, which could increase to 1,229 when the cruiser was a fleet flagship.

Indianapolis was laid down by New York Shipbuilding Corporation on 31 March 1930. The hull and machinery were provided by the builder. Indianapolis was launched on 7 November 1931, and commissioned on 15 November 1932. She was the second ship named for the city of Indianapolis, following the cargo ship of the same name in 1918. She was sponsored by Lucy M. Taggart, daughter of former Mayor of Indianapolis Thomas Taggart.

Interwar period

Under Captain John M. Smeallie, Indianapolis undertook her shakedown cruise through the Atlantic and into Guantánamo Bay, until 23 February 1932. Indianapolis then transited the Panama Canal for training off the Chilean coast. After overhaul at the Philadelphia Navy Shipyard, she sailed to Maine to embark President Franklin D. Roosevelt at Campobello Island, New Brunswick, on 1 July 1933. Getting underway the same day, Indianapolis arrived at Annapolis, Maryland, on 3 July. She hosted six members of the Cabinet, along with Roosevelt, during her stay there. After disembarking Roosevelt, she departed Annapolis on 4 July, and steamed for Philadelphia Navy Yard.

On 6 September, she embarked United States Secretary of the Navy Claude A. Swanson, for an inspection of the Navy in the Pacific. Indianapolis toured the Canal Zone, Hawaii, and installations in San Pedro and San Diego. Swanson disembarked on 27 October. On 1 November 1933, she became flagship of Scouting Fleet 1, and maneuvered with the force off Long Beach, California. She departed on 9 April 1934, and arrived at New York City, embarking Roosevelt, a second time, for a naval review. She returned to Long Beach on 9 November 1934 for more training with the Scouting Force. She remained flagship of Scouting Force 1 until 1941. On 18 November 1936, she embarked Roosevelt a third time at Charleston, South Carolina, and conducted a goodwill cruise to South America with him. She visited Rio de Janeiro, Brazil, Buenos Aires, Argentina, and Montevideo, Uruguay, for state visits before returning to Charleston and disembarking Roosevelt's party on 15 December. President Roosevelt underwent his crossing the line ceremony on this cruise on 26 November: an "intensive initiation lasting two days, but we have all survived and are now full-fledged Shellbacks".

World War II

Indianapolis was absorbed into Task Force 12 and searched for the Japanese carriers responsible for the attack, though the force did not locate them. She returned to Pearl Harbor on 13 December and joined Task Force 11.

New Guinea campaign

Late in the afternoon of 20 February 1942, the American ships were attacked by 18 Japanese aircraft. Of these, 16 were shot down by aircraft from Lexington and the other two were destroyed by anti-aircraft fire from the ships.

On 10 March, the task force, reinforced by another force centered on the carrier , attacked Lae and Salamaua, New Guinea, where the Japanese were marshaling amphibious forces. Attacking from the south through the Owen Stanley mountain range, the US air forces surprised and inflicted heavy damage on Japanese warships and transports, losing few aircraft. Indianapolis returned to the Mare Island Naval Shipyard for a refit before escorting a convoy to Australia.

Aleutian Islands campaign

Indianapolis then headed for the North Pacific to support American units in the Battle of the Aleutian Islands. On 7 August, Indianapolis and the task force attacked Kiska Island, a Japanese staging area. Although fog hindered observation, Indianapolis and other ships fired their main guns into the bay. Floatplanes from the cruisers reported Japanese ships sunk in the harbor and damage to shore installations. After 15 minutes, Japanese shore batteries returned fire before being destroyed by the ships' main guns. Japanese submarines approaching the force were depth-charged by American destroyers and Japanese seaplanes made an ineffective bombing attack. In spite of a lack of information on the Japanese forces, the operation was considered a success. US forces later occupied Adak Island, providing a naval base farther from Dutch Harbor on Unalaska Island.

1943 operations

In January 1943, Indianapolis supported a landing and occupation on Amchitka, part of an Allied island hopping strategy in the Aleutian Islands.

On the evening of 19 February, Indianapolis led two destroyers on a patrol southwest of Attu Island, searching for Japanese ships trying to reinforce Kiska and Attu. She intercepted the Japanese  cargo ship,  laden with troops, munitions, and supplies. The cargo ship tried to reply to the radio challenge but was shelled by Indianapolis. Akagane Maru exploded and sank with all hands. Through mid-1943, Indianapolis remained near the Aleutian Islands, escorting American convoys and providing shore bombardments supporting amphibious assaults. In May, the Allies captured Attu, then turned on Kiska, thought to be the final Japanese holdout in the Aleutians. Allied landings there began on 15 August, but the Japanese had already abandoned the Aleutian Islands, unbeknownst to the Allies.

After refitting at Mare Island, Indianapolis moved to Hawaii as flagship of Vice Admiral Raymond A. Spruance, commanding the 5th Fleet. She sortied from Pearl Harbor on 10 November, with the main body of the Southern Attack Force for Operation Galvanic, the invasion of the Gilbert Islands. On 19 November, Indianapolis bombarded Tarawa Atoll, and next day pounded Makin (see Battle of Makin). The ship then returned to Tarawa as fire-support for the landings. Her guns shot down an enemy plane and shelled enemy strongpoints as landing parties fought Japanese defenders in the Battle of Tarawa. She continued this role until the island was secure three days later. The conquest of the Marshall Islands followed victory in the Gilberts. Indianapolis was again 5th Fleet flagship.

1944

The cruiser met other ships of her task force at Tarawa, and on D-Day minus 1, 31 January 1944, she was one of the cruisers that bombarded the islands of Kwajalein Atoll. The shelling continued on D-Day, with Indianapolis suppressing two enemy shore batteries. Next day, she destroyed a blockhouse and other shore installations and supported advancing troops with a creeping barrage. The ship entered Kwajalein Lagoon, on 4 February, and remained until resistance disappeared (see Battle of Kwajalein).

In March and April, Indianapolis, still flagship of the 5th Fleet, attacked the Western Carolines. Carrier planes at the Palau Islands on 30–31 March, sank three destroyers, 17 freighters, five oilers and damaged 17 other ships. Airfields were bombed and surrounding water mined. Yap and Ulithi were struck on 31 March, and Woleai on 1 April. Japanese planes attacked but were driven off without damaging the American ships. Indianapolis shot down her second plane, a torpedo bomber, and the Japanese lost 160 planes, including 46 on the ground. These attacks prevented Japanese forces stationed in the Carolines from interfering with the US landings on New Guinea.

In June, the 5th Fleet was busy with the assault on the Mariana Islands. Raids on Saipan began with carrier-based planes on 11 June, followed by surface bombardment, in which Indianapolis had a major role, from 13 June (see Battle of Saipan). On D-Day, 15 June, Admiral Spruance heard that battleships, carriers, cruisers, and destroyers were headed south to relieve threatened garrisons in the Marianas. Since amphibious operations at Saipan had to be protected, Spruance could not withdraw too far. Consequently, a fast carrier force was sent to meet this threat while another force attacked Japanese air bases on Iwo Jima and Chichi Jima, in the Bonin and Volcano Islands, bases for potential enemy air attacks.

A combined US fleet fought the Japanese on 19 June in the Battle of the Philippine Sea. Japanese carrier planes, which planned to use the airfields of Guam and Tinian to refuel and rearm, were met by carrier planes and the guns of the Allied escorting ships. That day, the US Navy destroyed a reported 426 Japanese planes while losing 29. Indianapolis shot down one torpedo plane. This day of aerial combat became known as the "Marianas Turkey Shoot". With Japanese air opposition wiped out, the US carrier planes sank , two destroyers, and one tanker and damaged others.

Indianapolis returned to Saipan on 23 June to resume fire support and six days later moved to Tinian to attack shore installations (see Battle of Tinian). Meanwhile, Guam had been taken, and Indianapolis became the first ship to enter Apra Harbor since early in the war. The ship operated in the Marianas for the next few weeks, then moved to the Western Carolines, where further landings were planned. From 12 to 29 September, she bombarded Peleliu, in the Palau Group, before and after the landings (see Battle of Peleliu). She then sailed to Manus Island, in the Admiralty Islands, where she operated for 10 days before returning to the Mare Island Naval Shipyard in California for refitting.

1945

Overhauled, Indianapolis joined Vice Admiral Marc A. Mitscher's fast carrier task force on 14 February 1945. Two days later, the task force launched an attack on Tokyo to cover the landings on Iwo Jima, scheduled for 19 February. This was the first carrier attack on mainland Japan since the Doolittle Raid. The mission was to destroy Japanese air facilities and other installations in the Home Islands. The fleet achieved complete tactical surprise by approaching the Japanese coast under cover of bad weather. The attacks were pressed home for two days. The US Navy lost 49 carrier planes while claiming 499 enemy planes, a 10-to-1 kill/loss ratio. The task force also sank a carrier, nine coastal ships, a destroyer, two destroyer escorts, and a cargo ship. They destroyed hangars, shops, aircraft installations, factories, and other industrial targets.

Immediately after the strikes, the task force raced to the Bonin Islands to support the landings on Iwo Jima. The ship remained there until 1 March, protecting the invasion ships and bombarding targets in support of the landings. Indianapolis returned to VADM Mitscher's task force in time to strike Tokyo, again on 25 February, and Hachijō, off the southern coast of Honshū, the following day. Although weather was extremely bad, the American force destroyed 158 planes and sank five small ships while pounding ground installations and destroying trains.

The next target for the US forces was Okinawa, in the Ryukyu Islands, which were in range of aircraft from the Japanese mainland. The fast carrier force was tasked with attacking airfields in southern Japan until they were incapable of launching effective airborne opposition to the impending invasion. The fast carrier force departed for Japan from Ulithi on 14 March. The attack targeted airfields on Kyūshū, as well as ships of the Japanese fleet in the harbors of Kobe and Kure, on southern Honshū. The Japanese located the American task force on 21 March, sending 48 planes to attack the ships. Twenty-four fighters from the task force intercepted and shot down all the Japanese aircraft.

Indianapolis was assigned to Task Force 54 (TF 54) for the invasion of Okinawa. When TF 54 began pre-invasion bombardment of Okinawa on 24 March, Indianapolis spent 7 days pouring 8-inch shells into the beach defenses. During this time, enemy aircraft repeatedly attacked the American ships. Indianapolis shot down six planes and damaged two others. On 31 March, the day before the Tenth Army (combined U.S. Army and U.S. Marine Corps) started its assault landings, the Indianapolis lookouts spotted a Japanese Nakajima Ki-43 "Oscar" fighter as it emerged from the morning twilight and dived vertically towards the bridge. The ship's 20 mm guns opened fire, but within 15 seconds the plane was over the ship. The bomb plummeted through the deck, into the crew's mess hall, down through the berthing compartment, and through the fuel tanks before crashing through the keel and exploding in the water underneath. The concussion blew two gaping holes in the keel which flooded nearby compartments, killing nine crewmen. The ship's bulkheads prevented any progressive flooding. Indianapolis, settling slightly by the stern and listing to port, steamed to a salvage ship for emergency repairs. Here, inspection revealed that her propeller shafts were damaged, her fuel tanks ruptured, and her water-distilling equipment ruined. Indianapolis then steamed under her own power to the Mare Island Naval Shipyard for repairs.

Transporting nuclear weapons

After major repairs and an overhaul, Indianapolis received orders to undertake a top-secret mission of the utmost significance to national security: to proceed to Tinian island carrying the enriched uranium (about half of the world's supply of uranium-235 at the time) and other parts required for the assembly of the atomic bomb codenamed "Little Boy", which would be dropped on Hiroshima a few weeks later.

Indianapolis departed San Francisco's Hunters Point Naval Shipyard on 16 July 1945, within hours of the Trinity test. Arriving at Pearl Harbor on 19 July, she raced on unaccompanied, delivering the atomic bomb components to Tinian on 26 July.

Indianapolis was then sent to Guam, where a number of the crew who had completed their tours of duty were relieved by other sailors. Leaving Guam on 28 July, she began sailing toward Leyte, where her crew was to receive training before continuing on to Okinawa to join Vice Admiral Jesse B. Oldendorf's Task Force 95.

Sinking

The explosions caused massive damage. Indianapolis took on a heavy list (the ship had had a great deal of armament and gun-firing directors added as the war went on, and was therefore top-heavy) and settled by the bow. Twelve minutes later, she rolled completely over, then her stern rose into the air and she sank. Some 300 of the 1,195 crewmen aboard went down with the ship. With few lifeboats and many without life jackets, the remainder of the crew was set adrift.

Rescue

Navy command did not know of the ship's sinking until survivors were spotted in the open ocean three and a half days later. At 10:25 on 2 August, a PV-1 Ventura flown by Lieutenant Wilbur "Chuck" Gwinn and his copilot, Lieutenant Warren Colwell, and a PBY-2 Catalina piloted by Bill Kitchen spotted the men adrift while on a routine patrol flight. Gwinn immediately dropped a life raft and radio transmitter. All air and surface units capable of rescue operations were dispatched to the scene at once.

First to arrive was an amphibious PBY-5A Catalina patrol plane flown by Lieutenant Commander (USN) Robert Adrian Marks. Marks and his flight crew spotted the survivors and dropped life rafts; one raft was destroyed by the drop while others were too far away from the exhausted crew. Against standing orders not to land in open ocean, Marks took a vote of his crew and decided to land the aircraft in  swells. He was able to maneuver his craft to pick up 56 survivors. Space in the plane was limited, so Marks had men lashed to the wing with parachute cord. His actions rendered the aircraft unflyable. After nightfall, the destroyer escort , the first of seven rescue ships, used its searchlight as a beacon and instilled hope in those still in the water. Cecil J. Doyle and six other ships picked up the remaining survivors. After the rescue, Marks' plane was sunk by Cecil J. Doyle as it could not be recovered.

Many of the survivors were injured, and all suffered from lack of food and water (leading to dehydration and hypernatremia; some found rations, such as Spam and crackers, among the debris of the Indianapolis), exposure to the elements (dehydration from the hot sun during the day and hypothermia at night, as well as severe desquamation due to continued exposure to saltwater and bunker oil), and shark attacks, while some killed themselves. Other survivors were found in various states of delirium or suffered from hallucinations.  Only 316 of the nearly 900 men set adrift after the sinking survived. Two of the rescued survivors, Robert Lee Shipman and Frederick Harrison, died in August 1945.

Hundreds of sharks were drawn to the wreck by the noise of the explosions and the scent of blood in the water. After picking off the dead and wounded, they began attacking survivors. The number of deaths attributed to sharks ranges from a few dozen to 150.

"Ocean of Fear", a 2007 episode of the Discovery Channel TV documentary series Shark Week, states that the sinking of Indianapolis resulted in the most shark attacks on humans in history, and attributes the attacks to the oceanic whitetip shark species. Tiger sharks may also have killed some sailors. The same show attributed most of the deaths on Indianapolis to exposure, salt poisoning, and thirst/dehydration, with the dead being dragged off by sharks.

Navy failure to learn of the sinking

The Headquarters of Commander Marianas on Guam and of the Commander Philippine Sea Frontier on Leyte kept Operations plotting boards on which were plotted the positions of all vessels with which the headquarters were concerned. However, it was assumed that ships as large as Indianapolis would reach their destinations on time, unless reported otherwise. Therefore, their positions were based on predictions and not on reports. On 31 July, when she should have arrived at Leyte, Indianapolis was removed from the board in the headquarters of Commander Marianas. She was also recorded as having arrived at Leyte by the headquarters of Commander Philippine Sea Frontier. Lieutenant Stuart B. Gibson, the operations officer under the Port Director, Tacloban, was the officer responsible for tracking the movements of Indianapolis. The vessel's failure to arrive on schedule was known at once to Gibson, who failed to investigate the matter and made no immediate report of the fact to his superiors. Gibson received a letter of reprimand in connection with the incident. The acting commander and operations officer of the Philippine Sea Frontier also received reprimands, while Gibson's immediate superior received a letter of admonition (a less severe military punishment than a reprimand).

In the first official statement, the Navy said that distress calls "were keyed by radio operators and possibly were actually transmitted" but that "no evidence has been developed that any distress message from the ship was received by any ship, aircraft or shore station". Declassified records later showed that three stations received the signals but none acted upon the call. One commander was drunk, another had ordered his men not to disturb him, and a third thought it was a Japanese trap.

When the ship failed to reach Leyte on 31 July, as scheduled, no report was made that she was overdue. The Navy then created the Movement Report System to prevent such disasters in the future.

Court-martial of Captain McVay

Captain Charles B. McVay III, who had commanded Indianapolis since November 1944 through several battles, survived the sinking, though he was one of the last to abandon ship, and was among those rescued days later. In November 1945, he was court-martialed on two charges: failing to order his men to abandon ship and hazarding the ship. Cleared of the charge of failing to order abandon ship, McVay was convicted of "hazarding his ship by failing to zigzag". Several aspects of the court-martial were controversial. There was evidence that the Navy itself had placed the ship in harm's way. McVay's orders were to "zigzag at his discretion, weather permitting"; however, McVay was not informed that a Japanese submarine was operating in the vicinity of his route from Guam to Leyte. Further, Commander Mochitsura Hashimoto, commanding officer of I-58, testified that zigzagging would have made no difference. Fleet Admiral Chester Nimitz remitted McVay's sentence and restored him to active duty. McVay retired in 1949 as a rear admiral.

While many of Indianapolis survivors said McVay was not to blame for the sinking, the families of some of the men who died thought otherwise: "Merry Christmas! Our family's holiday would be a lot merrier if you hadn't killed my son", read one piece of mail. The guilt that was placed on his shoulders mounted until he died by suicide in 1968, using his Navy-issued revolver. McVay was discovered on his back patio by his gardener with a toy sailor in one hand, and a revolver in the other. He was 70 years old.

McVay's record cleared

In 1996, sixth-grade student Hunter Scott began his research on the sinking of Indianapolis for a class history project. Scott's effort led to an increase in national publicity, which got the attention of retired Congressional lobbyist Michael Monroney, who had been scheduled to be assigned to Indianapolis before she shipped out on her final voyage. Around the same time, Captain William J. Toti, USN, final commanding officer of the fast attack nuclear submarine  received an appeal from several Indianapolis survivors to assist with the exoneration effort. Toti then demonstrated through analysis that the tactic of zigzagging would not have spared the Indianapolis from at least one torpedo hit by the I-58. Monroney brought the matter to the attention of his son-in-law, who was on the staff of Senator Bob Smith (R, NH) and was able to get the issue in front of Smith. Smith convinced Senator John Warner (R, VA) to hold hearings on the Senate Armed Services Committee on 14 September 1999, in which several Indianapolis survivors testified. Also called to testify in the hearings were Vice Chief of Naval Operations Admiral Donald Pilling, Director of Naval History Center Dr. William Dudley, and the Judge Advocate General of the Navy Rear Admiral John Hutson. The hearings were reported to sway Senator Warner into allowing a "Sense of Congress" resolution clearing Captain McVay's name to be passed to full Congress for a vote. In October 2000, the United States Congress passed a resolution that Captain McVay's record should state that "he is exonerated for the loss of Indianapolis". President Bill Clinton also signed the resolution. The resolution noted that, although several hundred ships of the US Navy were lost in combat during World War II, McVay was the only captain to be court-martialed for the sinking of his ship. In July 2001, United States Secretary of the Navy Gordon England directed Captain Toti to enter the Congressional language into McVay's official Navy service record, clearing him of all wrongdoing.

Commanders

Commanders of USS Indianapolis:

Awards
 Combat Action Ribbon
 American Defense Service Medal with fleet clasp
 Asiatic-Pacific Campaign Medal with ten battle stars
 American Campaign Medal
 World War II Victory Medal

Wreck discovery

The wreck of Indianapolis is in the Philippine Sea. In July–August 2001, an expedition sought to find the wreckage through the use of side-scan sonar and underwater cameras mounted on a remotely operated vehicle. Four Indianapolis survivors accompanied the expedition, which was not successful. In June 2005, a second expedition was mounted to find the wreck. National Geographic covered the story and released it in July. Submersibles were launched to find any sign of wreckage, although they only located pieces of metal that were not proven conclusively to be from the ship.

In July 2016, new information came out regarding the possible location of Indianapolis when naval records were discovered indicating that the Tank Landing Ship  recorded passing by Indianapolis 11 hours before the torpedoes struck. This information allowed researchers to determine that Indianapolis had been moving faster and was therefore farther west than previously assumed, as well as slightly off the route taken. Using this information, National Geographic planned to mount an expedition to search for the wreck in the summer of 2017.

The wreck was revealed to the public on 13 September 2017, in a live TV show on PBS titled "USS Indianapolis, Live from the Deep", starring Miles O'Brien and also including now-retired Captain William Toti. The wreck is well-preserved due to the great depth at which Indianapolis rests, among the rocky mountain ranges of the North Philippine Sea.

In September 2017, a map detailing the wreckage was released. The bridge, which broke off the ship due to the torpedoes, lies in a debris field near the forward guns. The single 8-inch gun turret on the stern remains in place, though the stern's roof collapsed over itself. The full exposition of the method by which the wreck was located and documented was released in another PBS documentary on 8 January 2019 titled USS Indianapolis: The Final Chapter.

Reunions

Since 1960, surviving crew members have been meeting for reunions in Indianapolis. Fourteen of the thirty-two remaining survivors attended the 70th reunion, held 23–26 July 2015. The reunions are open to anyone interested, and have more attendees each year, even as death leaves fewer survivors. Held only sporadically at first, then biannually, the reunions were later held annually. Every year, the survivors, by 2015 most of them in their nineties, vote whether to continue. Seven out of twenty remaining survivors attended the 2017 reunion. With the death of Cletus Lebow on 29 September 2022, there is only one crew member still alive, Harold Bray.

Memorials

The USS Indianapolis Museum had its grand opening on 7 July 2007, with its gallery in the Indiana War Memorial Museum at the Indiana World War Memorial Plaza.

The USS Indianapolis Memorial was dedicated on 2 August 1995. It is located on the Canal Walk in Indianapolis. The heavy cruiser is depicted in limestone and granite and sits adjacent to the downtown canal. The crewmembers' names are listed on the monument, with special notations for those who died. It was designated a national memorial by Congress in 1993.

In May 2011, the I-465 beltway around Indianapolis was named the USS Indianapolis Memorial Highway.

Some material relating to Indianapolis is held by the Indiana State Museum. Her bell and a commissioning pennant were formerly located at Heslar Naval Armory but currently reside at the Indiana War Memorial Museum.

In popular culture
In a scene in the 1975 movie Jaws, one of the main characters, Quint, who is a survivor of the Indianapolis, recounts the sinking and shark attacks. This scene brought Indianapolis, and its sinking, into a much wider public spotlight 30 years after the original events occurred.

The 1991 made-for-TV film, Mission of the Shark: The Saga of the U.S.S. Indianapolis, stars Stacy Keach as Captain McVay.

The 2016 film USS Indianapolis: Men of Courage, directed by Mario Van Peebles and starring Nicolas Cage, is based on the sinking of Indianapolis.

See also

 List of U.S. Navy losses in World War II
 List of ships sunk by submarines by death toll
 List of United States Navy cruisers
 List of national memorials of the United States

Notes

References

Sources

Further reading

 
 
 
 
 
 
  Publishers Weekly Notable Book Award; Massachusetts Book Award
 
 .

External links

 USS Indianapolis Museum official website
 USS Indianapolis Survivors Organization
 Another USS Indianapolis Survivors Organization
 Maritime Quest Indianapolis Pictures
 1945 Kamikaze Damage Report – filed by Mare Island Naval Shipyard
 Allied Warships: USS Indianapolis (CA 35), Heavy cruiser of the Portland-class
 
 IndySurvivor.com – website and book by survivor Edgar Harrell, USMC
 Announcement of the Father Thomas Conway Memorial (June 2006). (At USS Indianapolis Museum official website, in the left-hand column, click on "2006 Museum Activities".)
 BBC Magazine
 

 USS Indianapolis (decked in flags) and the passenger liner Aquitania at the Statue of Liberty
 
 , a History Channel documentary
 Roll of Honor

1931 ships
2017 archaeological discoveries
Congressional Gold Medal recipients
Indianapolis
Maritime incidents in July 1945
Monuments and memorials in Indiana
National Memorials of the United States
Portland-class cruisers
Shark attacks
Ships built by New York Shipbuilding Corporation
Ships of the Aleutian Islands campaign
Ships sunk by Japanese submarines
Shipwreck discoveries by Paul Allen
World War II cruisers of the United States
World War II shipwrecks in the Pacific Ocean